The Coalition for Cayman (C4C) is a political party on the Cayman Islands and took first part at the Caymanian general election 2013. They received 18.6% and won 3 seats in the Legislative Assembly.

References 

Political parties in the Cayman Islands